Elections were held in Kentucky 6am to 6pm on Tuesday, November 8, 2011. Primary elections were held on Tuesday May 17, 2011. .

State officials
Governor/Lt. Governor Slate

Secretary of State

Attorney General

Auditor of Public Accounts

State Treasurer

Commissioner of Agriculture
Republican:

James R. Comer

 Democrats:
Robert "Bob" Farmer

References

External links
Kentucky State Board of Elections
Kentucky Candidate List at Imagine Election - Search for candidates by address or zip code
Kentucky Polls at Pollster.com
Kentucky 2010 campaign finance data for state-level candidates from Follow the Money

 
Kentucky